Günlüce is a village in Ödemiş district of İzmir Province, Turkey. It is situated to the north of Ödemiş. The population of Günlüce is 1491. as of 2011. The ruins of Lydian city of Hypaepa are to the north of the town. During the Seljuks and Ottoman era, the present settlement was known as Dağdibi or Dadbey.

References

Populated places in İzmir Province
Towns in Turkey
Ödemiş District